This is a list of the Sites of Special Scientific Interest (SSSIs) in Monmouthshire.

Sites

See also
 List of SSSIs by Area of Search

References

Monmouthshire
Monmouthshire